

Events 
November – Paul Peuerl becomes organist at Horn, Austria.
Claudio Monteverdi is appointed maestro di musica to Duke Vincenzo Gonzaga at Mantua.
Giovanni Bassano succeeds Girolamo Dalla Casa as head of the instrumental ensemble at St Mark's Cathedral, Venice.

Publications
Gregor Aichinger –  (Augsburg: Officina Praetoriana), a collection of sacred songs for three and four voices
Adriano Banchieri – , fourth book of canzonettas for three voices (Venice: Ricciardo Amadino)
Valerio Bona
Second book of masses and motets for two choirs (Venice: Ricciardo Amadino)
First book of madrigals and canzonas for five voices (Venice: Angelo Gardano)
Joachim Burmeister –  for four voices (Rostock: Stephan Myliander)
Giulio Caccini –   (The New Music) (Florence: Giorgio Marescotti)
Giovanni Croce
 for five voices (Venice: Giacomo Vincenti)
First book of canzonettas for three voices (Venice: Giacomo Vincenti)
Christoph Demantius – 77  for four and five voices (Nuremberg: Catharina Dieterich for Konrad Baur)
Johannes Eccard –  for six voices (Königsberg: Georg Osterberger), a wedding song
Andrea Gabrieli –  for three, four, five, six, and eight voices (Venice: Angelo Gardano), published posthumously, also includes pieces by Ippolito Chamaterò, Orazio Vecchi, and Geminiano Capilupi
Bartholomäus Gesius –  (Sacred German Songs) for four and five voices (Frankfurt an der Oder: Johann Hartmann)
Gioseffo Guami –  (Venice: Giacomo Vincenti)
Adam Gumpelzhaimer – , book one, for eight voices (Augsburg: Valentin Schönigk)
Hans Leo Hassler
 for four, five, six, and eight voices (Nuremberg: Paul Kauffmann)
, book 1 (Augsburg: Valentin Schönigk)
Jakob Hassler –  for four voices (Nuremberg: Paul Kauffmann), also includes a mass and a setting of Psalm 51
Joachim van den Hove –  (Utrecht: Salomon de Roy & Johannes Guilielmus de Rhenen)
Robert Jones – The Second Booke of Songes or Ayres
Claude Le Jeune – The 150 Psalms for four and five voices (Paris: the widow of R. Ballard and his son Pierre Ballard), published posthumously
Luzzasco Luzzaschi –  (Rome: Simone Verovio), featuring works written before 1597 for the 
Tiburtio Massaino – Third book of motets for six voices (Venice: Ricciardo Amadino)
Simone Molinaro – Second book of motets for eight voices (Milan: Simon Tini & Francesco Besozzi)
Philippe de Monte – last of thirty-four books of madrigals
Thomas Morley (ed.) – Madrigales The Triumphs of Oriana, to 5. and 6. voices: composed by divers severall aucthors
Asprilio Pacelli –  (Venice, Giacomo Vincenti)
Pietro Paolo Paciotto – , book 1 (Rome, Nicolo Mutii)
Giovanni Pierluigi da Palestrina – Twelfth book of masses, published posthumously
Orfeo Vecchi
The seven penitential psalms for six voices (Milan: the heirs of Simon Tini & Giovanni Francesco Besozzi)
 (Psalms for the solemnities of the whole year) (Milan: the heirs of Simon Tini & Giovanni Francesco Besozzi)

Classical music 
Ballet du Roy Henry IV

Musical theatre
Adriano Banchieri – , a madrigal comedy

Opera 
none listed

Births 
date unknown – Michelangelo Rossi, opera composer (died 1656)
probable – Jacques Champion de Chambonnières, French harpsichordist and composer (died 1672)

Deaths 
January 4 – Laura Peverara, singer (born c 1550)
May 19 – Costanzo Porta, composer (born c 1528)
November 26 – Benedetto Pallavicino, organist and composer (b. c. 1551)
date unknown – Girolamo Dalla Casa, composer

Notes 

 
Music
17th century in music
Music by year